IREF - Islamic Research & Educational Foundation ( is an Indian non-profit organization established in Hyderabad city of Telangana State, since February, 1998 C.E. The acronym of the Foundation is IREF.

History 
The Islamic Research & Educational Foundation was established in February 1998 C.E., in Hyderabad, India, by Br. Imran as he is popularly known for Mujtaba Hussain Siddiqui. Br. Imran was employed in TOYS 'R' US in Riyadh, KSA, during 1995 to 1997 when he happened to meet Sheiqh Ahmed Deedat (rh), while the latter was receiving treatment for lock-in-syndrome, in the Riyadh Hospital. Motivated by the dedication, work and zeal of Sheiqh Ahmed Deedat(rh), Br. Imran started to visit him in the hospital daily after his job. He was then encouraged by Yusuf Deedat s/o Sheiqh Ahmed Deedat(rh) to prepare five-minute talks on Islam and comparative religion and then deliver those talks in front of Sheiqh Ahmed Deedat(rh) in the hospital.

Sheiqh Ahmed Deedat(rh) was in such a condition that he could only move his eyes to communicate anything while his entire body was paralyzed. So, whenever Br. Imran delivered talks in front of Sheiqh Ahmed Deedat(rh) in his hospital room, then, Sheiqh Deedat(rh) would appreciate by moving his eyes up and down and if Br. Imran made mistakes, then, Sheiqh Deedat(rh) would move his eyes sideways and Yusuf Deedat, his son, would correct the mistakes of Br. Imran. This is how the learning of Br. Imran continued for months, when finally Br. Imran traveled to India to marry Builqees Begum alias Nida in January, 1997 C.E. After the marriage on his holiday vacation, when Br. Imran returned to Saudi Arabia and at the earliest went to meet Sheiqh Ahmed Deedat(rh), then, Br. Imran learnt from Yusuf Deedat that his father was being discharged and they were soon traveling back to South Africa, their home country.

In 2005, The Times of India reported the organization suggested women could not contest elections unless they wore a hijab. Sister Amtul Mateen, a women's activist at the organization also suggested it would be "better for woman to only lead the women". Sister Mateen stated "woman can be the boss of her husband at home as well as in business as long as they do not work in a sector forbidden by Islam, do not mix freely with the opposite sex or and wear a hijab."

The organization has undertaken programs and lectures seeking to draw a distinction between jihad and terrorism.

Description 

IREF aims to spread the message of Islam as established by Br. Imran (Mujtaba Hussain Siddiqui), specialized in comparative religion. IREF conducts yearly kid's camp where the children are taught basic fundamentals of Islam, how to perform Salah, to be obedient to parents.

References

External links 
 Official website

1998 establishments in Andhra Pradesh
Islamic organisations based in India
Research institutes in Hyderabad, India
Islamic organizations established in 1998